Matteo Ciampi (born 3 November 1996) is an Italian swimmer. He competed at the 2020 Summer Olympics in 4 × 200 m freestyle relay.

He competed in the 4×200 m freestyle relay event at the 2018 European Aquatics Championships, winning the bronze medal.

References

External links
 

1996 births
Living people
Swimmers from Rome
Italian male swimmers
Italian male freestyle swimmers
Medalists at the FINA World Swimming Championships (25 m)
European Aquatics Championships medalists in swimming
Mediterranean Games gold medalists for Italy
Mediterranean Games medalists in swimming
Swimmers at the 2018 Mediterranean Games
Universiade medalists in swimming
Universiade silver medalists for Italy
Medalists at the 2019 Summer Universiade
Swimmers at the 2020 Summer Olympics
21st-century Italian people
20th-century Italian people